The 1995 Argentina rugby union tour of Australia was a series of eight matches played by the Argentina national rugby union team in April and May  1995, in Australia, in order to prepare the 1995 Rugby World Cup

Matches
Scores and results list Argentina's points tally first.

References

1995
1995
tour
1995 in Australian rugby union
History of rugby union matches between Argentina and Australia